Chaetostoma patiae is a species of catfish in the family Loricariidae. It is native to South America, where it occurs in the Patía River basin in Colombia for which it is named. The species reaches 15.8 cm (6.2 inches) SL and reportedly inhabits high-altitude areas.

References 

patiae
Fish described in 1945
Freshwater fish of Colombia